Thakur Anoop Singh (born 23 March 1989) is an Indian actor and bodybuilder who primarily appears in Telugu films. He played Dhritarashtra in the 2013 TV series Mahabharat. In 2015 he won a gold medal in a bodybuilding contest in Bangkok, Thailand.

Personal life
His ancestral roots lie in Udaipur, Rajasthan,

Bodybuilding career

National and international titles

Television

Filmography

References

External links
 

1989 births
Living people
Rajasthani people
Indian male television actors
Male actors in Hindi cinema
Male actors in Tamil cinema
Male actors in Telugu cinema
Indian male film actors
Male actors from Mumbai
21st-century Indian male actors
Indian male martial artists
Bollywood playback singers